Northampton High School is a four-year secondary school located in the city of Northampton, Massachusetts, United States.

Student body
The student body is composed of approximately 900 students, supported by 75 staff members.

Theater program
Northampton High's theater program has been under the direction of Stephen Eldredge since his hire in 2005. Eldredge has acted, directed and taught theater in New York, San Francisco and New England for over 30 years.

Within the school is a 709-seat proscenium theater. A Black Box theater was added in 2012, providing an alternative performing, with room for 75 audience members. There is also a small theater which seats 90; it is used primarily for the school's chorus, chamber choir, and the a cappella group The Northamptones.  The seats were salvaged from Pleasant Street Theater, a defunct movie theater in downtown Northampton. In the spring, senior students are given the opportunity to produce, direct, and put up a show of their own in the Black Box. The theater program is also run by a well sized theater tech program, also run by Steve Eldredge.

Athletics

Athletics include varsity teams in football, soccer, swimming, baseball, basketball, lacrosse, wrestling, track and field, cross country, field hockey, fencing, skiing, crew, and ultimate frisbee.

Robotics
The school is home to the Northampton Devilbots, FIRST Robotics Competition (FRC) Team 4097, a regionally ranked team. The team was previously conjoined with a nearby school, Smith Vocational and Agricultural High School, however the team split from Smith Vocational and Agricultural High school in 2018.

Northampton Community Television
Northampton Community Television, a non-profit community media center, shares with the school.  Although not officially affiliated with the High School, Northampton Community Television's equipment and resources are made available to students to for school and community media and art projects. The high school's theater and technology programs often work together.

Notable alumni
 Abby Snow Belden (1896–1969), physical educator and outdoorswoman
 Willy Workman (born 1990), American-Israeli basketball player for Israeli team  Maccabi Haifa
David Pakman (born 1984), Argentinian-American political pundit, academic, and host of The David Pakman Show
 Jeff Zimbalist (born 1978), filmmaker

References

External links

Buildings and structures in Northampton, Massachusetts
Schools in Hampshire County, Massachusetts
Public high schools in Massachusetts